Stigmella oritis is a moth of the family Nepticulidae. It is found from Himachal Pradesh in India.

External links
Nepticulidae and Opostegidae of the world

Nepticulidae
Moths of Asia
Moths described in 1910